The Great Western Railway (GWR) 2800 Class is a class of Churchward-designed 2-8-0 steam locomotive.

History 
The class was designed by George Jackson Churchward for heavy freight work. They were the first 2-8-0 locomotive class in Great Britain.

The prototype, originally numbered 97 but later renumbered 2800, appeared in 1903. Construction of the production series commenced in 1905 and continued until 1919. The 2884 Class which appeared in 1938–1942 was developed from the 2800 class and is sometimes classified with it.

Prototype 
No. 97 was originally outshopped in lined black livery and undertook two years of trials before the type went into production. Initial results suggested that only the front end needed further development and where the boiler of No. 97 was parallel for the first four segments, the production series had the familiar taper boiler.

Production 
The most visible difference between No. 97 and the first of the 1905 production batch was the higher pitch of the boiler ( opposed to ). At first the prototype was given a  tender but almost without exception the 2800s were harnessed to the  variety throughout their working lives. Superheating was incorporated into the class from 1909 with No. 2808 the first to be retro-fitted. Other modifications centred on improving the weight distribution, altering smokebox lengths and fitting larger diameter chimneys. 
The 84 2800s built by Churchward were constructed over more than a decade and remained the GWR's principal long haul freight engines throughout the 1920s and 1930s. The only serious problem met with in traffic was with the sealing of the internal steam pipes and beginning in 1934 most of the class had them replaced with outside pipes. This change, along with a side-window cab, were the only notable changes for the later construction when a further 83 locomotives were built over a mere 3 years from 1938.

Operation
The 2800 class was particularly used for hauling heavy trains of coal from the South Wales coalfields to the large conurbations served by the GWR, and large numbers were allocated to sheds in South Wales, but the type was the main heavy freight type on the GWR and was used across the network. Due to the variety of freight flows it was found that individual locomotives could spend extended periods away from their home shed and a container was added to the left hand valence which carried details of boiler washout dates to ensure that this necessary activity was carried out in a timely manner.

There was no differentiation in duties between the original 2800 class of 1905 and the modified 2884 design of the 1930s.

At the outbreak of World War II, an order was placed for 60 additional locomotives for use in France, but this was cancelled following the evacuation at Dunkirk, the 10 engines that had already been completed being included in the GWR stocklist.

Oil firing 
Between 1945 and 1947, coal shortages caused GWR to experiment with oil fired 2800 locomotives and 12 of the 2800 class were converted. They were renumbered into the 4800 series, which necessitated re-numbering the entire 4800 class autotanks into the 1400 series, and reclassified as 1400 class. The experiment, encouraged by the government was abandoned in 1948 once the extra maintenance costs were calculated and the bill had arrived for the imported oil.

Accidents and incidents
On 6 January 1932, locomotive No. 2808 was hauling a freight train was in collision with a milk train at Didcot East Junction. The locomotive was extensively damaged. Ten wagon were destroyed and seventeen more were damaged. The milk train had overrun signals.
An express passenger train collided with the rear portion of the freight due to errors by the guard and signalman. Two people were killed.

Withdrawal

Preservation
Five 2800 Class locomotives survive, these being 2807, 2818, 2857, 2859, 2874, along with nine 2884 class locomotives. Two more survivors were used to provide parts for other projects. Only two members of the class have so far operated in preservation, these being 2807 and 2857. Currently only 2857 is operational, whilst 2807 is under overhaul which began in early 2020. One of the class, No. 2857, briefly operated on the main line in 1985.

2861, built in 1918, was one of the "Barry Ten" and eventually broken up for parts at the Llangollen Railway in 2014 and the frames scrapped. The cylinder and saddle block, along with several other components, are being used in the construction of the next GWR 4700 Class 2-8-0 No. 4709.

Models
Hornby Railways manufacture a model of the 28xx in OO gauge.

See also 
 List of GWR standard classes with two outside cylinders

References

Citations

References

Classic British Steam locomotives

External links

2800 class

2800
2-8-0 locomotives
Railway locomotives introduced in 1903
Freight locomotives
Standard gauge steam locomotives of Great Britain